The Chamb is a river in the Czech Republic and in Germany. It is a  right tributary of the Regen.

From there it flows southwestward through Eschlkam, Furth im Wald, and Arnschwang, joining the Regen east of the city of Cham (whose name is of similar Celtic etymology).

The discharge of the Chamb is variable.

References

Rivers of Bavaria
Rivers of the Plzeň Region
International rivers of Europe
Bohemian Forest
Rivers of Germany